The Rohrbach Ro II was an all-metal, 4-seat reconnaissance and bomber flying boat, designed and produced in Germany in 1923.

Development
Founded in 1923 by Dr.-Ing. Adolf Rohrbach, the Rohrbach Metall-Flugzeugbau GmbH designed and built many aircraft using light-alloy stressed skin construction methods that were at the cutting edge of aircraft design in the 1920s. His previous experience with light-alloys at the Zeppelin-Staaken factory served Rohrbach well when designing the Rohrbach stressed-skin aircraft.

After designing the un-built Ro I twin-engined flying boat, Rohrbach developed the Rohrbach Ro II flying boat as an all-metal shoulder winged monoplane flying boat with two tractor engines mounted in nacelles, above the wings, on struts. Planforms and profiles were kept as simple as possible with rectangular section fuselage frames (with vee planing bottoms), constant chord wings, tailplane and fin with square cut tips and distinctive protruding servo/trim/balance tabs at wing and fin tips. The two-seat open cockpit sat between the engines at the wing leading edge, with an open gunner/bosun's position at the extreme nose. A very unusual feature of several of Rohrbach's flying-boats was the provision of a pair of masts and sails to be rigged in the event of engine failure, allowing the aircraft to be sailed back to a safe harbour.

At the time of the Ro II's production the Versailles Treaty forbade the construction of large aircraft in Germany so Rohrbach set up a Danish company, the 'Rohrbach-Metall-Aeroplan Co. A/S', to build the early Rohrbach aircraft. The strict regulation of the aircraft industry was relaxed in 1926, allowing the Rohrbach series to be built at the Rohrbach Metall-Flugzeugbau GmbH factory in Berlin.

Operational history
The first flight of the Ro II took place on 11 November 1923, pilotted by Werner Landmann and the aircraft was used in FAI record attempts for speed/load on 24 October 1924. After trials and record attempts were completed the aircraft was sold to Mitsubishi Shoji Kaisha Ltd.,  re-designated Yokosho Experimental Type R 1 and used for trials by the Imperial Japanese Navy.

Operators
 Imperial Japanese Navy

Specifications

References

http://www.histaviation.com/Rohrbach_Ro_II.html
http://www.letletlet-warplanes.com/2008/06/04/german-flying-boats-part-1-1914-1935/4/

1920s German military aircraft
1920s German military reconnaissance aircraft
Flying boats
Rohrbach aircraft
Shoulder-wing aircraft
Aircraft first flown in 1923
Twin piston-engined tractor aircraft